The 1971 International cricket season was from May 1971 to August 1971.

Season overview

June

Pakistan in England

July

India in England

References

1971 in cricket